Kamal Hussain (born 24 January 1932) is an Egyptian wrestler. He competed in the men's Greco-Roman lightweight at the 1952 Summer Olympics.

References

1932 births
Living people
Egyptian male sport wrestlers
Olympic wrestlers of Egypt
Wrestlers at the 1952 Summer Olympics
Place of birth missing (living people)
20th-century Egyptian people